Jason Murphy (born August 7, 1982) is a former American football guard and offensive tackle. He was signed by the San Diego Chargers as an undrafted free agent in 2006. He played college football at Virginia Tech.

Murphy was also a member of the Seattle Seahawks, Tennessee Titans, New York Sentinels, Florida Tuskers and Baltimore Ravens.

External links
Tennessee Titans bio
Virginia Tech Hokies bio

1982 births
Living people
Players of American football from Baltimore
American football offensive guards
American football centers
American football offensive tackles
Virginia Tech Hokies football players
San Diego Chargers players
Seattle Seahawks players
Frankfurt Galaxy players
Tennessee Titans players
New York Sentinels players
Florida Tuskers players
Baltimore Ravens players